8 New Dates is a 2015 Russian-Ukrainian romantic comedy directed by Maryus Vaysberg. It is a sequel to the 2012 film 8 First Dates. The film stars Oksana Akinshina and Volodymyr Zelenskyy.

Plot
Vera and Nikita have been married for three years. Their family life turns out to be not so perfect and they decide to separate. And they are so impatient to end their relationship, that they are going to the registry office to submit an application for divorce the next day. In the midst of a quarrel, they exchange categorical opinions with each other about what constitutes as a "normal husband" and "good wife."

The next day they wake up each with their ideal partner in the same bed. Now each of them has their own better half: Nikita has a busty blonde (Polina Maksimova) who cooks well, and Vera has a caring husband-businessman (Mikhail Galustyan) who buys her favorite croissants for breakfast in the morning. Vera and Nikita end up having to choose whether to live with their new families, or to get back together again. As a result, the spouses understand that, despite the quarrels, their feelings for each other are strong, and they reconcile.

Cast
Oksana Akinshina – Vera Kazantseva
Volodymyr Zelenskyy – Nikita Andreevich Sokolov
Polina Maksimova – Kristina
Mikhail Galustyan – Timur
Victor Vasilyev – Lyosha
Sabina Akhmedova – Karina
Yevgeny Koshevoy – wedding guest
Natalia Iokhvidova – Nikita's secretary
Natalia Ungard – mother-in-law
Sergey Belyaev – father-in-law

References

External links 

 

2015 films
2010s Russian-language films
2015 romantic comedy films
Russian romantic comedy films
Ukrainian romantic comedy films
Films directed by Maryus Vaysberg
Russian-language Ukrainian films
Volodymyr Zelenskyy films